Sant'Ippolito Martire (Italian is a Baroque, Roman Catholic parish church in Palermo, region of Sicily, Italy. It is located on a busy street with markets, on via Porta Carini in the Capo quarter, across the street from the church of the Immacolata Concezione al Capo.

A parish church at the site is first mentioned in 1308. In 1583, during the Spanish rule of Sicily, the church was expanded; but the present church is a product of a refurbishment started in 1717 using designs by Andrea Palma. His grandson, Nicolò Palma, helped restore the church in 1769 and a further refurbishment was performed in 1844 under Giovanni Patricolo, who directed some of the fresco decoration. 

The entrance portal has bas-reliefs of Saints Peter, Hippolytus, and Paul. The Latin Cross layout has three naves with lateral chapels. The nave ceiling has a fresco depicting Jesus in Lake Tiberius, retouched in the 1950s.

External links 
 Gaspare Palermo, Guida istruttiva per potersi conoscere tutte le magnificenze della Città di Palermo, Volume IV, Palermo, Reale Stamperia, 1816, pages 52-56.

Roman Catholic churches in Palermo
Baroque architecture in Palermo
17th-century Roman Catholic church buildings in Italy